Hi-Fi Sci-Fi is the fifth studio album by alternative rock group Dramarama. Released in 1993, it was also their last studio album until Everybody Dies was released in 2005.

Critical reception
Robert Christgau wrote that "what's confusing, and a stroke, is that with Clem Burke pounding the skins and the band mixing and matching, it rocks louder, harder, and faster than anything they've done since going pro—or ever."

Track listing
All songs written by John Easdale, except for where noted. 
 "Introduction/Hey Betty" – 4:28
 "Work for Food" – 4:10
 "Shadowless Heart" – 5:13
 "Swallowed Your Cure" (Chris Carter, Tommy Mullaney) – 2:54
 "Where's the Manual?" – 5:23
 "Senseless Fun" – 4:39
 "Bad Seed" – 4:02
 "Incredible" (Carter, Easdale) – 4:18
 "Prayer" – 4:37
 "Don't Feel Like Doing Drugs" – 3:43
 "Right On Baby, Baby" – 4:23
 "Late Night Phone Call" – 5:32
 "28 Double Secret Bonus Tracks" – 5:35

Personnel

Nicky Hopkins – Piano
Benmont Tench – Piano/Keyboards
Clem Burke – Drums

References 

Dramarama albums
1993 albums
Elektra Records albums